Affinity is an album by American jazz pianist Bill Evans released in 1979, featuring Belgian harmonica player Toots Thielemans. Bill Evans plays a Rhodes piano on many of the tracks. It is the recording debut for bassist Marc Johnson.

Reception
With the exception of a four star Rolling Stone Jazz Record Guide review, the majority of recorded reception for the Affinity album came significantly later than its original release. Overall, reviewers maintain positive notes about the work. Scott Yanow on Allmusic says, "Excellent if not essential music that Evans generally uplifts".

Track listing
 "I Do It for Your Love" (Paul Simon) – 7:16
 "Sno' Peas" (Phil Markowitz) – 5:51
 "This Is All I Ask" (Gordon Jenkins) – 4:14
 "Days of Wine and Roses" (Henry Mancini, Johnny Mercer) – 6:40
 "Jesus' Last Ballad" (Gianni Bedori) – 5:52
 "Tomato Kiss"  (Larry Schneider) – 5:17
 "The Other Side of Midnight (Noelle's Theme)" (Michel Legrand) – 3:17
 "Blue in Green" (Miles Davis, Bill Evans) – 4:09
 "Body & Soul" (Edward Heyman, Robert Sour, Frank Eyton, Johnny Green) – 6:16

Personnel
Bill Evans – piano, keyboards
Marc Johnson – bass
Eliot Zigmund – drums
 Larry Schneider – flute, tenor saxophone, soprano saxophone
Toots Thielemans – harmonica
Production notes
Helen Keane – producer
Frank Laico – engineer

Chart positions

References

External links
The Bill Evans Memorial Library

Bill Evans albums
Toots Thielemans albums
1979 albums
Warner Records albums